Pilling's Cascade, also known as Renshawe's Cascade, is a waterfall in Piute County, Utah. The waterfall flows over a massive cliff of rocks which are cut by joints, common of Bullion Canyon.

See also 
 List of waterfalls in Utah

References

Waterfalls of Utah
Landforms of Garfield County, Utah